Mary Abigail Wambach (born June 2, 1980) is an American retired soccer player, coach, and member of the National Soccer Hall of Fame. A six-time winner of the U.S. Soccer Athlete of the Year award, Wambach was a regular on the U.S. women's national soccer team from 2003 to 2015, earning her first cap in 2001. As a forward, she currently stands as the highest all-time goal scorer for the national team and is second in international goals for both female and male soccer players with 184 goals, behind Canadian Christine Sinclair. Wambach was awarded the 2012 FIFA World Player of the Year, becoming the first American woman to win the award in ten years. She was included on the 2015 Time 100 list as one of the most influential people in the world.

Wambach competed in four FIFA Women's World Cup tournaments: 2003 in the United States, 2007 in China, 2011 in Germany, and 2015 in Canada, being champion of the last edition; and two Olympics tournaments: 2004 in Athens and 2012 in London, winning the gold medal on both. All together, she played in 29 matches and scored 22 goals at these five international tournaments. She played college soccer for the Florida Gators women's soccer team and helped the team win its first NCAA Division I Women's Soccer Championship. She played at the professional level for Washington Freedom, magicJack, and the Western New York Flash.

Known for scoring goals with diving headers, a technique she began honing as a youth in her hometown of Rochester, New York, one of her most notable header goals occurred in the 122nd minute of the 2011 FIFA Women's World Cup quarterfinal match against Brazil. Wambach scored the equalizer in stoppage time helping the Americans to eventually progress to the championship final against Japan after defeating Brazil in penalty kicks. Her last-minute goal set a new record for latest goal ever scored in a match and was awarded ESPN's 2011 ESPY Award for Best Play of the Year. Following her performance at the 2011 World Cup, she was awarded the tournament's Bronze Boot and Silver Ball. In 2011, she became the first ever soccer player of either gender to be named Athlete of the Year by the Associated Press.

Wambach announced her retirement on October 27, 2015. Her last game was played on December 16 in New Orleans when the United States played its last match of its 10-game Victory Tour following its win at the 2015 FIFA Women's World Cup. Her autobiography, Forward, released in September 2016, became a New York Times best seller. Her second book, Wolfpack: How to Come Together, Unleash Our Power and Change the Game, based on her viral commencement speech at Barnard College, was also a New York Times Bestseller in 2019.

Early life
Born in Rochester, New York, Wambach was raised in the Rochester suburb of Pittsford. She is the youngest of seven siblings (with two sisters and four brothers) born to Pete and Judy Wambach. She began playing soccer at the age of four after her sister decided she wanted to try the sport. Their mother checked out a book from the library explaining how to play the game, and from then on soccer became part of their family tradition. "I think I was bred to do what I do now", Wambach said in an interview. "Growing up as the youngest of seven was like being in a team environment, you learn all kinds of things ... I learned how to compete, my brothers and sisters always played with me on the same level and they never let me win until I was better than them and deserved it. Being in such a big family makes you humble. You might have a certain skill or talent but there is always someone who is better at something than you."

Wambach recalls being toughened up by her elder brothers firing hockey pucks at her for target practice. While playing in her first youth soccer league at age five, she was transferred from the girls' team to the boys' after scoring 27 goals in only three games. As a pre-teen, she began eluding defenders by heading the ball over them and running around them.

Wambach attended Our Lady of Mercy High School in Rochester from 1994 to 1998, where she lettered in soccer and basketball. During her high school career, she scored 142 goals, including 34 in 1997 alone. Mercy's soccer coach, Kathy Boughton, recalled that Wambach often stayed after practice to practice diving headers – a skill that later became her signature as an international player. Following her senior season, Wambach was named to Parade magazine's High School All-America Team. She was also voted national high school player of the year by Umbro and the National Soccer Coaches Association of America (NSCAA). In 1997, she was named NSCAA Regional Player of the Year, NSCAA State of New York Player of the Year, Gatorade Circle of Champions New York Player of the Year, and cited by USA Today as one of the nation's top 10 recruits.

Wambach was a three-year captain for the Rochester Spirit club team and named All-Greater Rochester Player of the Year in 1995 and 1997. She was a member of the Olympic Development Program (ODP) U-16 National Team in 1996, the 1997 National U-20 Player Pool, and trained and played with the U.S. women's national soccer team while competing in the 1997 U.S. Soccer Festival in Blaine, Minnesota. In 1997, she traveled to Beijing, China, as a member of the first American youth soccer team to ever compete there. University of Florida Gators, 1998–2001
Considered the top college recruit in 1997, Wambach was intensely sought after by numerous colleges, including top soccer programs such as the University of North Carolina, UCLA, the University of Portland, and the University of Virginia. After sticking with her commitment to her parents to visit five schools, Wambach accepted a full athletic scholarship to attend the University of Florida in Gainesville, where she played for coach Becky Burleigh's Florida Gators women's soccer team from 1998 to 2001. Florida's program had only been in existence for three years; however, the challenge of joining a less established team over a team like North Carolina with a long history of championship titles appealed to Wambach. As a freshman in 1998, Wambach helped lead the Gators to their first NCAA national championship over the 15-time champion North Carolina Tar Heels. The team also won four consecutive Southeastern Conference (SEC) championships from 1998 to 2001.

Individually, she was the SEC Freshman of the Year (1998), a freshman All-American (1998), a first-team All-SEC selection for four straight seasons (1998, 1999, 2000, 2001), a two-time SEC Player of the Year (2000, 2001), twice received SEC Tournament Most Valuable Player honors (2000, 2001), and was named a first-team All-American her sophomore, junior, and senior seasons in 1999, 2000 and 2001. In addition to leading the Gators to the Final Four of the NCAA Division I Women's Soccer Tournament as a senior in 2001, Wambach set school career records for goals (96), assists (50), points (242), game-winning goals (24), and hat tricks (10). Over ten years later, she remains the Florida Gators' all-time leading scorer with ninety-six goals. Wambach was inducted into the University of Florida Athletic Hall of Fame as a "Gator Great" in 2012.

Club career

Washington Freedom: the WUSA years, 2002–03
In 2002, Wambach was selected second during the first round of the 2002 WUSA Draft by the Washington Freedom for the second season of the Women's United Soccer Association (WUSA). After tying with the Carolina Courage for last place during the previous season, the Freedom hoped to turn things around in 2002. With Mia Hamm out for the first half of the season for knee surgery and recovery, the Freedom found themselves in sixth place. After Hamm's return, the team finished the remainder of the season 9–1–2, finishing third with a berth into the playoffs. Of the team's turnaround, Wambach noted, "Early on in the season it was difficult to get everyone on the same page. Mia was out, we had just started playing with the Chinese players, Steffi hadn't come yet. There were so many factors that went into us not playing as well. Since people have returned, and we have been able to grasp what exactly one another was doing out there, it's been easier to get results." During the semi-finals, the Freedom upset the Philadelphia Charge 1–0. During the final against the Carolina Courage, the Freedom lost in front of 12,000 spectators at Herndon Stadium in Atlanta. Wambach assisted on Hamm's 64th-minute goal, the team's second goal, after the Courage's Danielle Fotopoulos scored an own goal in the 31st minute; however, it was not enough to equalize Carolina's three goals. After leading all first-year players in the league in scoring, Wambach was named WUSA Rookie of the Year in 2002. She was Washington's leading scorer with ten goals and ten assists and finished tied for fourth for scoring in the WUSA. She scored twice in the inaugural 2002 WUSA All-Star Game, being named game MVP.

During the 2003 season, Wambach tied with Freedom teammate, Mia Hamm for the league's scoring lead with 33 points. Her contributions in Washington helped to propel the Freedom to a victory in the Founders Cup III, where Wambach was named the MVP. During the seventh minute of regulation time, she scored the second-fastest goal in Founders Cup history after she headed the ball into the lower left side of the net past Beat goalkeeper and national team teammate, Brianna Scurry. She scored the game-winning goal in the sixth minute of overtime off a cross from Jennifer Meier, leading the Freedom to defeat the Atlanta Beat 2–1 during the championship match.

Five days before the 2003 FIFA Women's World Cup, the first World Cup that Wambach would play in, the WUSA folded citing financial difficulties and a lack of sponsorship. In summer 2005 she played for Women's Premier Soccer League (WPSL) club Ajax America Women, alongside USWNT teammate Shannon Boxx. She scored five goals and served three assists in three appearances.

WPS: Wambach's return to Washington and Florida, 2009–11

In 2008, a new professional league was announced for women in the United States: Women's Professional Soccer (WPS). During the 2008 WPS Player Allocation in which twenty-one players from the United States national team player pool were assigned to the seven teams in the new league, Wambach was assigned to the Washington Freedom. She was voted WPS Player of the Week for the week of April 26 (Week 5) after scoring two goals in the Washington Freedom's 4–3 victory over the FC Gold Pride, the Freedom's first victory in the new league. During the Freedom's next game on May 3, 2009, she received a yellow card for a tackle on St. Louis Athletica midfielder Daniela that left Daniela with two damaged knee ligaments and a crack in the tibia and sidelined her for the rest of the season. Wambach was suspended for one game after the challenge was reviewed by the league commissioner.

Wambach won the WPS Player of the Week award for the week of July 28 (Week 18) for scoring two goals against the Chicago Red Stars and Sky Blue FC and for the week of Aug 11 (Week 20) for scoring two goals and having one assist against Sky Blue. She ended the 2009 season with eight goals more than any other American player in the WPS and was named to the 2010 WPS All-Star Team.

Wambach returned to the Washington Freedom for the 2010 WPS season, winning the WPS Player of the Week award in week 2 for scoring one goal and serving two assists against the Atlanta Beat. She was the top overall vote-getter in WPS All-Star voting, making her one of two captains for the 2010 WPS All-Star Game. Wambach received 100% of the media's and coaches' votes and received the most fans' votes-with 31%.

In 2011, the Freedom relocated to Boca Raton, Florida and became the magicJack under new ownership. On July 22, 2011, Wambach was named the player-coach for the magicJack for the rest of the 2011 WPS season. She was named WPS Player of the Week for the seventh time in August 2011.

On October 26, 2011, the Women's Professional Soccer League Governors voted to terminate the magicJack franchise. The league suspended operations in early 2012.

NWSL: Leading the Flash in Rochester, 2013–14

In 2012, a new professional women's soccer league was announced in the U.S. that featured allocated players from the American, Mexican, and Canadian national teams. On January 11, 2013, Wambach was allocated to the National Women's Soccer League club, Western New York Flash, in her hometown of Rochester, New York, as part of the NWSL Player Allocation. After missing the preseason because of national team commitments, she made her debut on April 14, 2013, during the team's season opener against Sky Blue FC.

During the team's second regular season match against the Washington Spirit in Boyds, Maryland, Wambach was struck hard in the face from close range on an attempted clearance by her teammate, Brittany Taylor, in the 80th minute of the match. She dropped to the ground and appeared disoriented after standing up. Though she continued playing to finish the match and even attempted to score a goal with her head, she dropped to the ground after the final whistle and was described by Spirit goalkeeper, Ashlyn Harris as dazed and mumbling. Wambach was assessed after the game for concussion. US Soccer announced several days later that she had suffered a concussion and acknowledged that the injury should have been handled differently by the referee, coaching staff, and players. Wambach sat out the next game as a precautionary health measure. She made her home debut for the Flash on May 1 and scored the match-winning goal in the 20th minute to defeat Sky Blue 2–1. It was the team's first league win and lifted them to a three-way tie for third place in the league.

Wambach was named Week 5 NWSL Player of the Week after scoring both goals in the Flash's 2–1 victory over FC Kansas City. She became the first player in the league to win the award twice after scoring a goal and serving an assist during the Flash's 3–0 win over Sky Blue FC during Week 9.

Wambach announced on March 18, 2015, that she was sitting out the entire 2015 NWSL season in order to focus on the 2015 FIFA Women's World Cup. Two weeks later, on March 30, 2015, Wambach's playing rights were traded along with midfielder Amber Brooks and a first-round pick in the 2016 NWSL College Draft to Seattle Reign FC in exchange for forwards Sydney Leroux and Amanda Frisbie.

International career

In 2001, Wambach's WUSA and collegiate performance earned her a spot at the national team training camp. Her first cap for the United States women's national soccer team occurred on September 9, 2001, during a match against Germany at the Nike U.S. Cup in Chicago. She subbed in for Tiffeny Milbrett in the 76th minute. The U.S. won 4–1. She scored her first international goal on April 27, 2002, during a friendly match against Finland in San Jose, California after subbing in for Christie Welsh in the 75th minute. The U.S. won 3–0.

2003 FIFA Women's World Cup

In August 2003, Wambach was named to the U.S. roster by Coach April Heinrichs for her first World Cup tournament. Having played in just six international matches, with three starts, before the 2003 World Cup, Wambach led the United States in scoring with three goals at the tournament.

Before a stadium filled with over 34,144 spectators at RFK Stadium in Washington D.C., Wambach made the starting line-up in the Americans' first match of the tournament against Sweden on September 21, 2003. The U.S. defeated Sweden 3–1 with goals scored by Kristine Lilly, Cindy Parlow, and Shannon Boxx. During the squad's second tournament match against Nigeria in Philadelphia in front of 31,553 spectators, Wambach scored in the 65th minute to bring the U.S. lead to 4–0. The U.S. would ultimately defeat Nigeria 5–0. She scored her third tournament goal during the squad's third Group stage match against North Korea on a penalty kick in the 17th minute. The U.S. defeated North Korea 3–0 after two additional goals from Cat Whitehill in the 48th and 66th minutes launching the team to the knock-out stage.

Wambach scored the only goal against Norway during the quarterfinal, paving the way for the Americans to the semi-finals. The Americans lost to Germany 3–0 in the semi-finals and were relegated to third place after their 3–1 win over Canada in the finals in front of 25,253 people at the Home Depot Center in Carson, California.

2004 Summer Olympics
After the WUSA suspended operations in 2003, Wambach trained with the national team in preparation for the 2004 Summer Olympics in Athens, Greece. During the U.S.'s first two matches in Athens, she played a direct role in four of the five goals that the team scored resulting in wins over Greece and Brazil. During the team's first group stage match against Greece on August 11, 2004, Wambach scored during the 30th minute to elevate the Americans to a 2–0 lead. She received her first yellow card of the tournament in the 49th minute. Mia Hamm followed with a goal in the 82nd minute for a final score of 3–0.

The U.S. faced Brazil during their second match of the tournament on August 14. Wambach received her second yellow card of the tournament in the 49th minute, giving her an automatic suspension for the final group stage match against Australia. After Hamm scored on a penalty kick in the 58th minute, Wambach sealed the win with a goal in the 77th. After moving on to the quarterfinals after a 1–1 tie against Australia in the final group stage match, the Americans faced Japan on August 20. Wambach's goal in the 59th minute lifted the Americans to a 2–1 victory.

After defeating Germany in overtime during the semi-final, the U.S. faced Brazil for a second time in the Olympic final. Wambach's 10-yard header in the 112th minute off a corner kick from Kristine Lilly gave the U.S. a 2–1 victory and the gold medal win. Her last-minute goal was hailed as one of the five biggest goals in U.S. women's national team history by ESPN in 2011. Wambach finished the tournament with four goals and one assist. Her four goals set a new record for goals scored by a single U.S. player at an Olympic Tournament. The Olympic win also marked the start of significant changes for the national team as it was the final competitive international match for veteran players Mia Hamm, Joy Fawcett and Julie Foudy, who had played with the team since the first Women's World Cup in 1991. On the significance of the win, Wambach said, "It's the least we can do for the women who have meant so much to us." At the end of 2004, Wambach had scored 31 goals and 13 assists in 30 matches for the national team. She finished fourth in voting for the FIFA Women's World Player of the Year.

After the Athens Olympics, Wambach continued as a major contributor to the national team, scoring goals during the 2005 Algarve Cup and a number of exhibition games. During group play at the Algarve Cup, one of her goals helped the U.S. set a record for the largest goal margin in an Algarve Cup match after their 5–0 win over Denmark. At the end of 2006, Wambach had scored 66 goals in 84 international matches, scoring more goals in fewer games than any player since Michelle Akers. She was one of twenty players nominated for the 2006 FIFA Women's World Player of the Year and finished fourth in voting for the award.

2007 FIFA Women's World Cup
Heading into the 2007 FIFA Women's World Cup, the national team had not conceded a game in regulation time in nearly three years and was considered a favorite to win the tournament in China. Wambach had become a regular on the team for five years and had assumed a new position as leader on the team. During their first match of the tournament against North Korea, Wambach collided in the air with North Korean defender, Ri Kum-Suk, and landed on the ground with blood streaming down her head. She was sidelined from the pitch for ten minutes while she received five stitches to the back of her head. Coach Greg Ryan decided not to replace Wambach, who had scored 78 goals in 97 games. The United States was ahead 1–0 thanks to a goal Wambach had scored in the 50th minute, assisted by Kristine Lilly. The squad allowed two goals while Wambach was away for those ten minutes. "When they scored right away as I went off I started to get worried. So I started to run to the locker room to get stitches put in", Wambach said. A few minutes after Wambach returned to the pitch, the United States tied the match with a goal scored by Heather O'Reilly.

The team faced Sweden in their next match on September 14, 2007. Wambach scored two goals and notched up her record to 80 goals in 98 international matches after scoring in the 34th minute on a penalty kick and again in the 58th minute on a left-footed half-volley from a cross from Kristine Lilly. The U.S. finished group play with their 1–0 defeat over Nigeria on September 18. Wambach provided the assist with a header off a long thrown-in to Lori Chalupny who settled it off her chest and chipped the ball past Nigeria's goalkeeper. The win launched the U.S. to the quarterfinals.

During the quarterfinal match against England on September 22, 2007, Wambach scored the first goal for the Americans during the 48th minute, followed by two goals scored by teammates Shannon Boxx and Kristine Lilly, defeating England 3–0. All three goals were scored within 12 minutes. During the first half, with the match poised at 0–0, English captain Faye White required extensive treatment following an elbow in the face from Wambach. Although Wambach insisted the contact was accidental, the English players and media thought otherwise. Wambach became the twentieth player in U.S. women's national soccer team history (thirtieth American soccer player overall) to earn 100 international caps.

The United States faced Brazil in the semi-finals in what would become a controversial and game-changing match for the team. Coach Greg Ryan decided to bench starting goalkeeper, Hope Solo, and instead started Brianna Scurry, a veteran goalkeeper who had started in three World Cups and two Olympics, but who had started very few matches since the 2004 Olympics. The U.S. was defeated 4–0 by Brazil. The loss relegated them to a final match against Norway, which they won 4–1, to secure third place standing at the tournament. Wambach scored a brace with goals in the 30th and 46th minutes. She ended the tournament having scored six goals in six matches, despite her head injury and a previous foot injury suffered during a friendly match against Finland just a month prior to the World Cup.

2008 Summer Olympics

On June 23, 2008, Wambach was named to the U.S. squad for the 2008 Summer Olympics in Beijing, China. On July 16, during a nationally televised exhibition match against Brazil, she broke her left leg during a collision with Brazilian defender, Andréia Rosa, preventing her from playing at the Games.

Thirty-one minutes into the match in San Diego, California, Wambach ran at full speed seemingly to take a shot from about 30 yards and fiercely collided with Rosa. Wambach fell to the ground and immediately signaled for assistance. Her left leg was put in a brace and she was taken off the field on a stretcher. After being taken to a local hospital in an ambulance for X-rays, fractures to her tibia and fibula were confirmed. Wambach later underwent surgery to have a titanium rod inserted and was expected to be out of action for three months. The first match for the national team was slated to start on August 6. Wambach was the team's leading scorer at the time and had just reached 99 goals in 127 matches, just one shy of becoming the fifth U.S. player and ninth female player in world history to notch 100 career international goals.

"Obviously, it's devastating, but above everything else, I'm only one player, and you can never win a championship with just one player", Wambach said of her injury, "I have the utmost confidence in this team bringing home the gold." Although the team won the exhibition match with a goal scored by Natasha Kai off a free kick from Carli Lloyd and would enter the Games undefeated for the year, Wambach's teammates were unsettled by her injury. "My heart sank", Kai said, "We need her. She's a big piece of a great team."

Forward Lauren Cheney was called in to replace Wambach at the Games. "There are obviously tons of emotions going through me right now", Cheney said, "I have the deepest sorrow for Abby, but I am excited to be part of the 18 going to the Olympics." Wambach said during a conference call a few days after the injury, "I called Lauren Cheney from the hospital, 'I want you to go there and not feel bad about being selected in this type of way ... What's important is that the team going into this tournament is feeling that they can win this. At the end of the day, that's what makes you stand at the top podium."

Despite Wambach's absence, the U.S. took home gold after defeating Brazil 1–0 in the final. Midfielder Carli Lloyd scored the game-winning goal in the 96th minute off an assist from forward, Amy Rodriguez, in front of 51,162 spectators at Workers Stadium. The gold medal was the third for the national team, after winning titles at the 2004 Athens Olympics and 1996 Atlanta Games, the first Olympic tournament that included women's soccer.

Wambach scored her 100th goal during a friendly match against Canada in her hometown of Rochester on July 19, 2009, her second international match after returning from her injury. Of the goal, she said, "After this year I've had, the heartbreak of not going to the Olympics, all of that pain is worth it. There's nothing more you can ask for than play in front of your home crowd and come through with a milestone like I did today." She reached 100 goals in fewer games than any of the four other American players who had previously reached 100 goals: Mia Hamm, Kristine Lilly, Michelle Akers and Tiffeny Milbrett.

2011 FIFA Women's World Cup

On May 9, 2011, the U.S. roster for the 2011 FIFA Women's World Cup tournament in Germany was announced, including Wambach. The 2011 Women's World Cup was the third World Cup tournament in which she played. After playing without scoring a goal in the first two group stage matches against North Korea and Colombia, Wambach scored in the 67th minute during the team's final group stage match – a 2–1 loss to Sweden. With the loss, the U.S. finished second in their group and went on to face the first place team from Group D Brazil in the quarterfinal.

On July 10, 2011, during the Americans' quarter-final game against Brazil, Wambach scored a header goal in stoppage time after the 120th minute (120th+two minutes of injury time) to even the score at 2–2 against the Brazilians. The U.S. went on to win the game on penalty kicks and advanced to the semi-final. Wambach's goal set a new record for latest goal ever scored in a FIFA competition. Her last-minute goal was awarded ESPN's 2011 ESPY Award for Best Play of the Year. Wambach scored her third tournament goal during the Americans' 3–1 semi-final win over France.

During the final against underdogs Japan, Wambach's trademark header goal during the first half of extra-time (her fourth in the tournament), made her the United States' all-time scoring leader in FIFA Women's World Cup history with 13 goals, second to Brazil's Marta and Germany's Birgit Prinz (14 all-time goals each). The U.S. was forced to a penalty shootout after a late equalizer by Japan. Japan won 3–1, with Wambach converting the fourth and only successful penalty for the U.S.

Wambach's final tally for the 2011 FIFA Women's World Cup was four goals and one assist, an effort that earned her the 2011 FIFA Women's World Cup Bronze Boot after Brazil's Marta (4 goals, 2 assists, Silver Boot) and Japan's Homare Sawa (5 goals, 1 assist, Golden Boot). All 4 of Wambach's goals in the tournament were scored using her head. For her efforts, Wambach was awarded the 2011 FIFA Women's World Cup Silver Ball to go alongside her silver medal and Bronze Boot.

2012 Summer Olympics
Wambach scored the first goal for the U.S. at the 2012 Summer Olympics in London during the team's first group stage match against France on July 25, 2012. Down 2–0 after 14 minutes into the first half, Wambach headed the ball into the back of the net off a corner kick from Megan Rapinoe in the 19th minute. By the 30-minute mark, the Americans had tied the game with another goal from Alex Morgan. With another goal from Alex Morgan and one from Carli Lloyd during the second half, the U.S. defeated France 4–2.

During the United States' second group round game against Colombia, Wambach was struck in the right eye by an opposing player, but went on to score the second goal in her team's 3–0 victory. The goal was her sixth career Olympic goal, which broke the previous U.S. record held by Mia Hamm and Tiffeny Milbrett. It was also her 140th international goal inching closer to Hamm's record at 158 for most international goals scored. In the 38th minute, Colombian midfielder Lady Andrade ran into Wambach's path while the U.S. was pushing upfield and punched her in the face. Wambach fell to the ground in pain. The referees did not seem to see the play and made no call. Ending the match with a swollen black eye, Wambach described what happened, "I'm running toward the goal to get position, and I got sucker-punched", she said. "It's clear. We have it on film, so it's up to the Olympic committee and FIFA to decide what to do." After reviewing match footage, FIFA officials later imposed a two-match ban on the Colombian player.

During the United States' third group stage match against North Korea, Wambach scored the lone goal of the match during the 25th minute on a play that consisted of a long ball by Lauren Cheney to Alex Morgan. Morgan slid a pass between two defenders to Wambach who easily tapped in her third goal of the tournament. In front of 29,522 spectators at Old Trafford, the Americans finished first in their group with the win and it launched them to the quarter-final against New Zealand. The game also marked the first women's soccer game at Old Trafford in 23 years. During the quarter-final match against New Zealand, Wambach scored her fourth goal of the tournament during the 27th minute of the match. After sliding onto the ball to score, she then led a celebration of cartwheels – a tribute to the United States gymnastics team. With a second goal scored by Sydney Leroux in the 87th minute, the Americans defeated New Zealand 2–0 and moved onto the semi-finals. Wambach also scored the game-tying third goal, on a penalty kick, in the United States' 4–3 controversial semi-final win over Canada.

Wambach scored five goals at the 2012 Olympics and scored in every match except the final. In recognition of her accomplishments, she was awarded the 2012 FIFA World Player of the Year, at the 2013 FIFA Ballon d'Or gala in Zurich, on January 7, 2013.

2015 FIFA Women's World Cup

Prior to playing her fourth World Cup, Wambach declared that the Canada 2015 tournament would be her last. Given that nominal captain Christie Rampone started every game at the bench, Wambach was her first on-field substitute wearing the armband. She was the starting captain in three games, against Australia and Nigeria in the group stage and Colombia in the round of 16. Carli Lloyd, who acted as captain in the other four games, delivered the armband to Wambach as she entered the final against Japan with eleven minutes remaining, and Wambach in turn passed it over to Rampone as she entered at the 86th minute. Rampone reciprocated by allowing Wambach to lift the World Cup trophy with her. During the victorious campaign, Wambach scored in a 1–0 win against Nigeria, her last goal in official competition.

Career statistics

Club

International goals

In her international career, Wambach scored 184 goals in 255 international matches. Up until January 29, 2020, Wambach was the highest all-time international goal scorer for men and women, until surpassed by Canadian National Team Captain Christine Sinclair. Wambach (27 goals) and Alex Morgan (28 goals) combined for 55 goals in 2012 – equaling a 21-year-old record set in 1991 by Michelle Akers (39 goals) and Carin Jennings (16 goals) as the most goals scored by any duo in U.S. women's national team history.

World Cup and Olympic appearances and goals
Wambach competed in four FIFA Women's World Cup tournaments: 2003 in the United States, 2007 in China, 2011 in Germany and 2015 in Canada. She played in two Olympics tournaments: 2004 in Athens and 2012 in London. All together, she played in 30 matches and scored 22 goals at these five global tournaments. Along with her U.S. teammates, Wambach won two Olympic gold medals, finished third twice at the Women's World Cup, finished second at the 2011 World Cup, and won the 2015 Women's World Cup.

Style of play
Regarded as one of the greatest soccer players of all time, Wambach is known in particular for her goalscoring ability, and is the most prolific player in international competitions in soccer history. Although she was not the quickest or most technically gifted forward, Wambach was known for her physical, effective, and direct style of play, as well as her excellent sense of space and positioning, which allowed her to get onto the end of long balls and crosses, as well as making passes to her teammates with back headers and backheels. Her height and physique allowed her to excel in the air, and she was renowned for her ability to score with her head, frequently producing goals from spectacular diving headers, and in rare occasions, from bicycle kicks. Although primarily a striker, Wambach was also known for her energy and outstanding work rate throughout her career, ranking all-time third in the national team's number of assists behind Mia Hamm and Kristine Lilly, often dropping into midfield to assist her teammates defensively and help start attacking plays; this enabled her to play anywhere along the front-line, and also to function as a playmaker in midfield on occasion, in her later career. In addition to her playing abilities, Wambach was praised for her determination, tenacity, and leadership.

Honors and awards

Wambach is a six-time winner of the U.S. Soccer Federation's U.S. Soccer Athlete of the Year award (2003, 2004, 2007, 2010, 2011, 2013). In 2002, she received the WUSA's Rookie of the Year award for her performance during the 2001 WUSA season. During the three years that she played for the Washington Freedom and magicJack in the WPS, she was named WPS Player of the Week a record seven times.

In 2011, Wambach was awarded the Bronze Boot and Silver Ball at the FIFA Women's World Cup. She was also awarded the 2011 ESPY Award for Best Play for her 122nd-minute equalizing goal against Brazil during the quarterfinal. The same year, she was named the Women's Sports Foundation Sportswoman of the Year and received the Associated Press Female Athlete of the Year, the first individual soccer player ever – man or woman – to receive the award. In July 2011, the mayor of Rochester, New York named July 20 "Abby Wambach Day" and she was given a key to the city. In August 2012, after returning home from winning gold at the Summer Olympics in London, the city of Rochester honored Wambach by hosting a dedication and ribbon-cutting ceremony in which the entrance to Sahlen's Stadium was named "Wambach Way".

Wambach was named the 2012 FIFA World Player of the Year, becoming the fourth woman ever, and the first American since Mia Hamm 10 years earlier, to win the award. Wambach received 20.67 percent of the votes from national team coaches and captains as well as select media over teammate Alex Morgan (13.5) and five-time winner Marta (10.87). During her acceptance speech, she thanked FIFA and President Blatter, her family, coaching and medical staff, and teammates and said, "... winning any individual award is a total product of the team that you play for. I've never scored a goal without receiving a pass from somebody else. Thanks to all the fans out there who continue to inspire me and the rest of the team to win as many games as we can." Wambach was also a finalist for the award in 2011 and 2013.

Following the United States' win at the 2015 FIFA Women's World Cup, Wambach and her teammates became the first women's sports team to be honored with a Ticker tape parade in New York City. Each player received a key to the city from Mayor Bill de Blasio. In October of the same year, the team was honored by President Barack Obama at the White House.

In 2015, Wambach was named to the Time 100 list of the most influential people in the world. The following year, she received the 2016 ESPY Icon Award

For their first match of March 2019, the women of the United States women's national soccer team each wore a jersey with the name of a woman they were honoring on the back; Alex Morgan chose the name of Wambach.

Personal life
Wambach is married to author Glennon Doyle and resides in Hermosa Beach, California. She previously lived in Naples, Florida; Portland, Oregon; and Buffalo, New York.

Wambach was previously married to soccer player Sarah Huffman from 2013 to 2016. Following their wedding in Hawaii in October 2013, Wambach stated that her marriage was not a political statement and did not represent a coming out, because she had never been closeted: "I can't speak for other people, but for me, I feel like gone are the days that you need to come out of a closet. I never felt like I was in a closet. I never did. I always felt comfortable with who I am and the decisions I made." In September 2016, Wambach announced that she and Huffman were divorcing. Two months later, Wambach confirmed she was in a relationship with author and her future wife, Glennon Doyle. In February 2017, they announced their engagement. On May 14, 2017, the couple married.

Wambach was a supporter of Hillary Clinton's 2016 primary election campaign and spoke at several campaign events. She was included in the 2022 Fast Company Queer 50 list.

Controversy
Beginning in December 2015, Wambach came out against men's coach Jürgen Klinsmann and dual national players playing for the United States men's national soccer team. "The way that he has brought in a bunch of these foreign guys is not something I believe in wholeheartedly. I don't believe in it. I don't believe in it in my heart." A couple of members of the men's national team rebuked her for the criticism. Mix Diskerud, who was born in Norway to an American mother, was perhaps the most vocal in suggesting she "think about who you try to disenfranchise." She reaffirmed her criticism during an interview released in October 2016, stating, "It's just my opinion, and I'm entitled to that. It feels a little bit odd to me that you have some guys that have never lived in the United States that play for the United States because they were able to secure a passport. To me, that just feels like they weren't able to make it for their country and earn a living, so they're coming here."

Substance abuse and DUI arrest
Wambach was arrested for driving under the influence of intoxicants (DUII) after being pulled over by Portland police on April 2, 2016, to which she pleaded guilty. Following the incident, automaker MINI pulled a commercial featuring Wambach. In her autobiography, which was released several months after the incident, Wambach wrote that she had abused prescription drugs and alcohol for many years and had been sober since her April arrest.

Endorsements
Wambach has signed endorsement deals with Gatorade, Nike, MVP Healthcare, and Panasonic. In 2010, she starred in a Dodge commercial with some of her national team teammates. She signed a one-year endorsement deal with Bank of America in July 2011. The same year, she appeared in commercials for magicJack phone service and ESPN SportsCenter. In 2012, she received a gold card from Chipotle Mexican Grill which entitles her to one free burrito daily for life. Although not a formal endorsement deal, Chipotle offers the cards to well-known professional athletes who publicly express a liking for the restaurant. In the summer of 2013, she signed an endorsement deal with the New York Apple Association and was featured in television, radio, print and online ads. In 2015, Wambach starred in a commercial for LED lighting company Cree.

Philanthropy
Wambach has done philanthropic work for the Epilepsy Foundation and Juvenile Diabetes Research Foundation. She has participated in Mia Hamm's annual Celebrity Soccer Challenge which raises money for Children's Hospital Los Angeles and the Mia Hamm Foundation. In August 2011, Wambach joined teammates Alex Morgan and Hope Solo in a Bank of America charitable campaign at the Chicago Marathon. $5,000 was donated to the Juvenile Diabetes Association on her behalf. In 2013, she became an ambassador for Athlete Ally, a nonprofit organization that focuses on ending homophobia and transphobia in sports. She serves on the board of Together Rising, an all-women-led nonprofit organization founded by her wife, Glennon Doyle, supporting women, families, and children in crisis.

In popular culture

Television and film
Wambach appeared in the HBO film, Dare to Dream: The Story of the U.S. Women's Soccer Team. She has made appearances on the Today Show, the Late Show with David Letterman, The Daily Show with Jon Stewart, and Good Morning America. She was featured on ESPN's In the Game with Robin Roberts in June 2012.

In 2013, Wambach's biography was the focus of a one-hour ESPN documentary, Abby Head On. The same year, she appeared in the ESPN documentary series, Nine for IX. The Nine for IX documentary, The 99ers, in which Wambach appeared focused on the success and legacy of the national team that won the 1999 FIFA Women's World Cup.

In April 2015, Wambach joined Alex Morgan on American Idol to announce that the show's season winner would record the official song for Fox's coverage of the 2015 FIFA Women's World Cup. In May of the same year, her likeness appeared on The Simpsons along with Alex Morgan and Christen Press. In December 2015, she starred in a commercial for Gatorade entitled "Forget Me".

In July 2021, Wambach began hosting "Abby's Places", the first new series in the expansion of the Peyton's Places franchise on ESPN+.

Magazines
Wambach posed nude in The Body Issue of ESPN The Magazine in 2012. Of the experience, she said, "Bodies come in all different shapes. Bodies come in all different sizes. My body is very different than most other females. ... I want to show people that no matter who you are, no matter what shape you are, that's still beautiful."

Time magazine named her one of the 100 most influential people in the world in April 2015. The following month, she was featured on the cover of ESPN The Magazine with teammates Sydney Leroux and Alex Morgan. The same year, she appeared on multiple covers of Sports Illustrated. Out Magazine named Wambach Athlete of the Year in November 2015.

Video game and Barbie doll
Wambach was featured along with her national teammates in the EA Sports' FIFA video game series starting in FIFA 16, the first time women players were included in the game. In September 2015, she was ranked by EA Sports as the No. 3 women's player in the game. In February 2016, Mattel unveiled a Barbie doll in her likeness.

See also

 List of FIFA Women's World Cup winning players
 List of women's footballers with 100 or more international goals
 List of international goals scored by Abby Wambach
 List of multiple Olympic gold medalists in one event
 List of Olympic medalists in football
 List of players who have appeared in multiple FIFA Women's World Cups
 List of University of Florida Olympians

References

Match reports

Further reading
 Bankston, John (2013), Abby Wambach, Mitchell Lane Publishers, Inc., 
 Clinton, Hillary Rodham and Chelsea Clinton (2019), The Book of Gutsy Women: Favorite Stories of Courage and Resilience, Simon and Schuster, 
 Grainey, Timothy (2012), Beyond Bend It Like Beckham: The Global Phenomenon of Women's Soccer, University of Nebraska Press, 
 Kassouf, Jeff (2011), Girls Play to Win Soccer, Norwood House Press, 
 Killion, Ann (2018), Champions of Women's Soccer, Penguin, 
 Lisi, Clemente A. (2010), The U.S. Women's Soccer Team: An American Success Story, Scarecrow Press, 
 Longman, Jere (2009), The Girls of Summer: The U.S. Women's Soccer Team and How it Changed the World, HarperCollins, 
 Orr, Tamra (2007), Abby Wambach, Mitchell Lane Publishers, Inc., 
 Stevens, Dakota (2011), A Look at the Women's Professional Soccer Including the Soccer Associations, Teams, Players, Awards, and More, BiblioBazaar, 
 Wambach, Abby (2016), Forward: A Memoir, HarperCollins, 
 Wambach, Abby (2019), Wolfpack: How to Come Together, Unleash Our Power, and Change the Game, Celadon Books,

External links

 
 
 U.S. Soccer player profile
 2011 FIFA Women's World Cup player bio
 Washington Freedom (WUSA) bio (archived)
 Washington Freedom (WPS) bio (archived)
 Western New York Flash player profile 
 Abby Wambach  Video produced by Makers: Women Who Make America

1980 births
Living people
2003 FIFA Women's World Cup players
2007 FIFA Women's World Cup players
2011 FIFA Women's World Cup players
2015 FIFA Women's World Cup players
Ajax America Women players
American podcasters
American soccer coaches
American women's soccer players
American women podcasters
Lesbian sportswomen
FIFA Century Club
FIFA Women's World Cup-winning players
FIFA World Player of the Year winners
Florida Gators women's soccer players
Footballers at the 2004 Summer Olympics
Footballers at the 2012 Summer Olympics
LGBT association football players
LGBT memoirists
LGBT people from New York (state)
American LGBT sportspeople
MagicJack (WPS) players
Medalists at the 2004 Summer Olympics
Medalists at the 2012 Summer Olympics
National Women's Soccer League players
Olympic gold medalists for the United States in soccer
Parade High School All-Americans (girls' soccer)
People from Pittsford, New York
Soccer players from New York (state)
Sportspeople from Rochester, New York
United States women's international soccer players
Washington Freedom players
Western New York Flash players
Women's association football forwards
Women's Premier Soccer League players
Women's Professional Soccer coaches
Women's United Soccer Association players
21st-century American LGBT people
21st-century American women
Women's Professional Soccer players
National Soccer Hall of Fame members